The Premier Tenpin Bowling Club (PTBC) is Britain's premier ten-pin bowling association under the BTBA. It is the UK equivalent of the US PBA.

Organization

The purpose of the PTBC is to organise and promote a series of bowling tournaments on a 'Scratch' basis, that being a game without benefit of a handicap and works on the players actual scores.

The PTBC is run by a committee. The members are President Steve Thornton, Vice President Rob Thurlby, Secretary Andy James and Treasurer Alex Hamilton.

Membership

PTBC membership is subject to being a member of the BTBA and in regard to foreign nationals and professional players, they need to be members of their own national association. For example, in the United States it would be the PBA or USBC.

Tournaments

In PTBC tournaments, general rules will apply under BTBA regulations.

Major PTBC tournaments include the PTBC Storm English Open, PTBC Tour Masters and PTBC Airport Bowl/Challenge.

Other PTBC events include the PTBC Legends Challenge, PTBC Bromborough, Croydon Classic, Bruce Ford Memorial, and the PTBC Tolworth.

External links
 

Bowling organizations
Sports governing bodies in the United Kingdom
Tenpin bowling in the United Kingdom
Sports organisations of the United Kingdom